Brandon University is a university located in the city of Brandon, Manitoba, Canada, with an enrollment of approximately 3,375 (2020) full-time and part-time undergraduate and graduate students.  The current location was founded on July 13, 1899, as Brandon College as a Baptist institution.  It was chartered as a university by then President John E. Robbins on June 5, 1967. The enabling legislation is the Brandon University Act. Brandon University is one of several predominantly undergraduate liberal arts and sciences institutions in Canada.

The university is a member of the Association of Universities and Colleges of Canada (AUCC) and the Association of Commonwealth Universities (ACU), the Canadian University Society for Intercollegiate Debate (CUSID) and a member of U Sports. Brandon University has a student-to-faculty ratio of 11 to 1 and sixty percent of all classes have fewer than 20 students.  In the 2015 Macleans rankings of primarily undergraduate universities in Canada, Brandon University was ranked 16th out of 19 overall and #1 in the student to faculty ratio category The school of music is rated one of the best in Canada. The university press, The Quill, is a member of CUP.

History
The first Baptist missionaries arrived in southwestern Manitoba in 1869. Settlers began to arrive soon after.  In 1880, John Crawford and G. B. Davis founded Prairie College in Rapid City, but the college did not survive. Davis then founded a small academy in Rapid City; this was later taken over by his brother-in-law, S. J. McKee, and moved to Brandon in 1890.

Brandon College
Brandon College was established in Brandon in 1890 by the Baptist Union of Western Canada and was affiliated with McMaster University. In 1898 Toronto industrialist William Davies, along with his sister-in-law, Mrs. Emily Davies, pledged $25,000 towards the establishment of a Baptist College in Brandon.  The first principal of the college was A. P. McDiarmid.  McKee's Academy, including its building on Rosser Avenue, was merged into the new institution. On July 13, 1900, the cornerstone was laid by Mrs. Davies for the first building of the present campus, at the corner of 18th Street and Lorne Avenue. This and the adjoining Clarke Hall later became Brandon University's administration buildings.

Brandon College, built 1900-01 and the adjoining Clark Hall (1905–06) designed by architect William Alexander Elliott, a 3½-storey brick and stone complex are on the Registry of Historic Places of Canada. At this point Brandon College was a liberal arts college and offered some training in theology, secondary school classes, and a commercial department. A school of music was added in 1906.

The college remained affiliated with McMaster University between 1911 and 1938, and during this time the School of Music granted graduate diplomas in voice and piano.

Class enrollments were reduced during World War I as potential students signed up for military service. More than 200 Brandon College students served in the war; two of these won the Victoria Cross. A platoon from the college joined the Western Universities Battalion in France in 1916.

In 1922 college added a Science Building, and ceased offering commercial courses. Religious studies were integrated into the arts curriculum in 1928. After 1931, the college no longer taught Grade 9, 10, and 11 courses, but Grade 12 Department of Education courses were introduced and continued until 1955.

The Baptist Church ceased financing the institution in 1938 and the college became non-denominational. Funding to keep the college functioning was raised through public subscriptions, by an endowment from A. E. McKenzie, by tax levy from the City of Brandon, and through an annual grant from the government of Manitoba. The college became affiliated with the University of Manitoba; music courses as a credit to BA and BSc degrees were offered, and a Bachelor of Science program was implemented in 1939.

The COTC program was revived at the onset of World War II; once again enrolment dropped, as 234 Brandon College students joined Canada's armed forces. New bursaries and scholarships were introduced. At this point, the college had 14 faculty members and about 100 students. During the late 1940s, the social sciences were introduced.

Brandon College began training high school teachers in 1952, and elementary teachers three years later. The first graduates of the new Bachelor of Training program received degrees in 1971.

As part of a national program to expand universities and colleges, in the 1950s Brandon College increased its enrolment and by 1962 the Arts and Library Building, later named the A. E. McKenzie Building, the J. R. C. Evans Lecture Theatre, the steam plant, Darrach Hall (men's residence), and the dining hall were all completed.

In 1963 the college offered the first B.Mus. program in Manitoba, and the Music Building and Flora Cowan Hall (women's residence) were built. The School of Music developed a conservatory department and offered private tutoring. The Brandon University Gymnasium was opened in 1965.

A Manitoba Historical Plaque was erected in Brandon, Manitoba by the province to commemorate Brandon College's role in Manitoba's heritage.

Brandon University
In 1967 the college attained university status through the Brandon University Act. Her Royal Highness Princess Alexandra and the Honourable Angus Ogilvy were present at the presentation of the charter on June 5, 1967, That year The Education Building was opened, and in 1969 the Western Manitoba Centennial Auditorium was opened. McMaster Hall, a ten-storey co-ed residence, was completed in 1971, along with the Jeff Umphrey Memorial Centre for Mental Retardation, which housed a bookstore, bank, and a day centre as well as the research centre on mental disability.

The J. R. Brodie Science Centre began holding classes in 1971, and was opened officially in May 1972, providing facilities for a number of departments: chemistry, physics, botany, zoology, geology, geography, mathematics and computer science, and psychology. In early 1980, the Master of Music Degree Program was set up and in September 1980, the Applied Program began. A Master of Music (Education) program was implemented in 1981. A new music building, officially named in 1984 by Her Majesty Queen Elizabeth II as the "Queen Elizabeth II Music Building", was completed in 1985.

In September 1986, Brandon University began offering classes in the Department of Nursing and Health Studies program, providing 2-Year Post-Diploma Baccalaureate Degrees in Nursing and Mental Health. In 1990, the university also offered a major in Business Administration through the Faculty of Arts. A Masters of Education program was set up in 1990, and in 1991 the college offered a minor in Women's Studies in the Faculty of Arts. In 1993, a minor in Aboriginal Art was approved, and in 1996, the 4-Year Bachelor of Science in Psychiatric Nursing was initiated.

Between 1994 and 1997 Clark Hall and the Brandon College Building underwent renovation and reconstruction, with the retention of the original façade; these buildings house faculty and administration as well as classes. In 1997, the college initiated the School of Health Studies and a 4-Year Bachelor of Business Administration. In 1998, a Masters program in Rural Development and a bachelor's program in First Nations and Aboriginal Counselling were launched.

In 1999, the university celebrated its centennial. To mark the occasion, an excavation of the original Prairie College school site was carried out with the help of community members. The Applied Disaster and Emergency Studies program was initiated in the fall of 2001. The Health Studies Complex was opened in September 2003, to house the School of Health Studies and the First Nations and Aboriginal Counselling program. The complex includes a large round room equipped for holding traditional ceremonies performed by First Nations and Métis students.

By 2002, Brandon University had enrollment of 3,098 and a faculty of 220. The next year the Bachelor of Environmental Science program was implemented and a four-year Creative Arts program and the Bachelor of Fine Arts Program were begun. In September 2005 Brandon University's Rural and Community Studies Program expanded from its existing three-year BA program to include four-year honours, four-year major, and four-year minor Bachelor of Arts degrees.

In September 2008, a 17-day strike of the university's faculty took place. Contract negotiations broke down again in the fall of 2011, and a 45-day strike by university faculty members ensued.

In 2013, the university opened a Healthy Living Centre athletics facility, on the site of the former Kinsmen Memorial Stadium. The centre, which includes an indoor walking track, hosts the Bobcats and provides fitness facilities for students, faculty, staff, and the community.

Faculties, schools, departments, and research centres
Faculty of Arts
Aboriginal and Visual Arts, Anthropology, Business Administration, Drama, Economics, English, Gender and Women's Studies, History, Classical and Modern Languages, Native Studies, Philosophy, Political Science, Religion, Rural Development, Sociology
Faculty of Education
Administration and Educational Services, Curriculum & Instruction: Humanities, Curriculum & Instruction: Math/Science, Department of Educational Psychology and Foundations, Physical Education, Music Education, Graduate Studies
Faculty of Graduate Studies
 Graduate Diploma in Education, Master in Education, Music Graduate Program, Master of Psychiatric Nursing, Master in Rural Development, Graduate Diploma in Rural Development
Faculty of Science
Applied Disaster & Emergency Studies, Biology (Botany & Zoology discontinued in 2009), Chemistry, Environmental Science, Geography and Environment, Geology, Mathematics and Computer Science, Physics and Astronomy, Psychology
Faculty of Health Studies
Nursing, Psychiatric Nursing, Mental Health, Indigenous Health, and Human Services, First Nations and Aboriginal Counselling
School of Music
Honours (General Studies), Performance, Education, Jazz Studies, Graduate Studies in Performance, Music Education and Composition
 Research Centres
Rural Development Institute (RDI)
 Environmental Science Laboratories
 Micro Analytical Facility
 Study of Cultural Adaptations in the Prairie Ecozone (SCAPE)
 Brandon University Centre for Aboriginal and Rural Education (BU CARES)

Degrees and programs

Undergraduate
 Bachelor of Arts (BA)
 Bachelor of Business Administration (BBA)
 Bachelor of Education (BEd)
 Bachelor of Fine Arts (BFA)
 Bachelor of First Nations and Aboriginal Counselling (BFNAC)
 Bachelor of Music (BMus)
 Bachelor of Nursing (BN)
 Bachelor of Science (BSc)
 Bachelor of Science in Environmental Science (BSES)
 Bachelor of Science in Psychiatric Nursing (BScPN)

Graduate
 Master of Education (MEd)
 Master of Music (MMus)
 Master of Rural Development (MRD)
 Master in Psychiatric Nursing
 Master of Science in Environmental and Life Sciences (MELS)

Diplomas
 Graduate Diploma in Rural Development (GRD)
 Post Diploma in Mental Health (BScMN)

Programs
 Brandon University Hutterite Education Program (BUHEP)
 Program for the Education of Native Teachers (PENT)
 Community Based Education (CBE)

Defunct programs
 Brandon University Northern Teacher Education Program (BUNTEP)

Student activities

Athletics
The university's sports teams in U Sports are called the Brandon Bobcats. Brandon University competes in basketball (men/women) and volleyball (men/women). Brandon University used to field a men's hockey team in the CIAU, however, that ceased in 2000.

In the 2006–2007 academic year, the Bobcats advanced to the Canadian Basketball Finals. They placed second to Carleton University, in a hard-fought 52–49 game.

In 2016, the Bobcats hosted the CIS National Women's Volleyball Championship.

Music
Music students can join the Brandon University Orchestra.

Aboriginal

Brandon University provides services in more remote communities. Aboriginal Elders are present on campus at Brandon University to provide social support.

Governance

Administration
Chancellor – Mary Jane McCallum
President and Vice Chancellor – David Docherty
Provost and Vice President (Academic) – Kofi Campbell
Vice President (Administration & Finance) – Scott Lamont

Deans
Arts – Balfour Spence (Acting)
Education – Heather Duncan
Health Studies – Linda Ross (Acting)
Music – Greg Gatien
Science – Bernadette Ardelli

Student governance
Brandon University students are represented by the Brandon University Students' Union (BUSU). BUSU represents undergraduate, graduate, and distance students. BUSU is a member of the Canadian Federation of Students, local 37.

The current BUSU executive is:
President – Olufunke Adeleye
Vice President Internal – Vacant
Vice President External – Similouwa Omoteye

University chancellors
 Mary Jane McCallum (2021–Present)
 Michael Decter (2013–2021)
 Henry Champ (2009–2012)
 Edward Schreyer (2002–2008)
 Kevin Kavanagh (1996–2002)
 Ronald D. Bell (1991–1996)
 Stanley Knowles (1970–1990)
 Maitland Steinkopf (1967–1970)

University presidents
David Docherty (2019–present)
Steve Robinson (2017–2019)
Gervan Fearon (2014–2017)
Deborah Poff (2009–2014)
Louis Visentin (2000–2009)
Dennis Anderson (1990–2000)
John Mallea (1985–1990)
E. J. Tyler (1984–1985)
Harold J. Perkins (1977–1984)
Lloyd Dulmage (1970–1977)
R. F. B. King (1969–1970, acting president)
John E. Robbins (1967–1969, president Brandon University)
John E. Robbins (1960–1967, president Brandon College)
H. S. Perdue (1959–1960, acting president)
Dr. J. R. C. Evans

Notable alumni

 Marjorie Beaucage, Métis filmmaker
 Henry Champ, Canadian broadcast journalist
 Tommy Douglas, father of medicare and The Greatest Canadian (as voted on by CBC viewers)
 Stanley Knowles, New Democratic Party Member of Parliament
 Frank McKinnon, sports executive and Member of Order of Canada
 Andy Murray, NHL and Team Canada Head Coach
 Brian Pallister, Conservative Party of Canada Member of Parliament, Manitoba MLA and Premier of Manitoba
 Mike Pellicciotti, American politician and Washington State Treasurer
 H. Clare Pentland, historian at the University of Manitoba 
 Neil Robertson, mathematician known for the Robertson–Seymour theorem
 John W. M. Thompson, Manitoba MLA and provincial cabinet minister

Scholarships
The university joined Project Hero, a scholarship program cofounded by General (Ret'd) Rick Hillier, for the families of fallen Canadian Forces members.

The Government of Canada sponsors an Aboriginal Bursaries Search Tool that lists over 680 scholarships, bursaries, and other incentives offered by governments, universities, and industry to support Aboriginal post-secondary participation. Brandon University scholarships for Aboriginal, First Nations and Métis students include: Maria Ross Scholarship; Isabelle Douglas Estate Scholarships; Manitoba Blue Cross George J. Strang Scholarship; Gerdau MRM Steel Inc. Annual Scholarship; Donna and Bill Parrish Scholarship for Aboriginal Students; Scotiabank Scholarships for Aboriginal students in financial need; Manitoba Industry, Economic Development and Mines Bursaries in Geology; First Nations Teacher Education Scholarships; Manitoba Citizens' Bursary Fund for Aboriginal Peoples; Louis Riel Institute Bursaries; Manitoba Hydro Employment Equity Bursary.

See also
 Higher education in Manitoba
 Education in Canada
 List of universities in the Canadian Prairies
 U Sports
 Canadian government scientific research organizations
 Canadian university scientific research organizations
 Canadian industrial research and development organizations

Books
 C. G. Stone and F. Joan Garnett. Brandon College: A History, 1899–1967. Brandon: Brandon University, 1969.

References

External links

 Brandon University Official Website
 Brandon University Students Union Official Website (BUSU)
 Brandon University Athletics
 Brandon University

 
Universities and colleges in Manitoba
Universities established in the 19th century